Blanca Peak is the fourth highest summit of the Rocky Mountains of North America and the U.S. state of Colorado. The ultra-prominent  peak is the highest summit of the Sierra Blanca Massif, the Sangre de Cristo Range, and the Sangre de Cristo Mountains. The summit is the highest point of both counties and the entire drainage basin of the Rio Grande. Below the steep North Face of Blanca Peak two live Glaciers once developed, until extinction sometime after 1903. North & South Blanca Glaciers were located at 37° 35N.,longitude 105° 28W. Blanca Peak is higher than any point in the United States east of its longitude.

The Blanca Peak Tripoint is the highest point in Huerfano County.

Geography
Blanca Peak is located at the southern end of the Sangre de Cristo Range, a subrange of the more extensive Sangre de Cristo Mountains, and is the highest peak in both ranges. Approximately  to the north-northwest is Great Sand Dunes National Park and Preserve.

Blanca Peak is notable not only for its absolute height, but also for its great local relief and dominant position at the end of the range, rising high above the San Luis Valley to the west.

Blanca Peak heads up three major creeks. Holbrook Creek is on the west, flowing from a basin including Crater Lake, Blue Lakes, and Como Lake. An extremely challenging four wheel drive road accesses Como Lake , and provides the most common access to Blanca Peak. The Como Lake Road is a designated Alamosa County Road and runs to the edge of the Sangre de Cristo Wilderness just short of Blue Lakes. The Como Lake Road is rated as the most challenging 4WD road in Colorado. The Huerfano River flows from the north side of Blanca Peak. A road, starting out as a two-wheel drive road, then becoming a four-wheel drive road (less challenging than the Como Lake Road), provides access to the technical climbing on the North Face of Blanca Peak. Blanca Creek drains Blanca Basin under the south slopes of the peak, and Little Ute Creek descends from the Winchell Lakes on the southeast side. However these are not used to access the peak due to private property.

Three other fourteeners are nearby: Mount Lindsey to the east, Ellingwood Point to the north and Little Bear Peak to the southwest. Ellingwood Point is connected to Blanca by a short, high ridge, and is often climbed in conjunction with Blanca. Little Bear also has a high connecting ridge to Blanca, but it is a technical traverse, only recommended for highly experienced parties.

Geology
The granite that makes up the Blanca massif is pre-Cambrian in age, dated at approximately 1.8 billion years old. The major part of the Wet Mountains to the east and the Front Range to the northeast are also pre-Cambrian, also about 1.8 billion years old. In contrast, the Sangre de Cristo Range to the north and the Culebra Range to the south are Permian rock between 250 and 300 million years old.

History
Blanca Peak is known to the Navajo people as the Sacred Mountain of the East:  (or Tsisnaasjiní), the Dawn or White Shell Mountain. The mountain is considered to be the eastern boundary of the Dinetah, the traditional Navajo homeland. It is associated with the color white, and is said to be covered in daylight and dawn and fastened to the ground with lightning. It is gendered male.

Summitpost notes that "the first recorded ascent of Blanca by the Wheeler Survey was recorded on August 14, 1874, but to their surprise they found evidence of a stone structure possibly built by Ute Indians or wandering Spaniards."

Historical names
Blanca Peak 
Mount Blanca
Sierra Blanca Peak
Sierra Blanca
Sisnaajiní

See also

List of mountain peaks of North America
List of mountain peaks of the United States
List of mountain peaks of Colorado
List of Colorado county high points
List of Colorado fourteeners
List of Ultras of the United States

Notes

References

External links

Blanca Peak on 14ers.com
Blanca Peak at The Colorado Hiker
High resolution zoomable panorama of Blanca Peak

Mountains of Colorado
Mountains of Alamosa County, Colorado
Mountains of Costilla County, Colorado
Mountains of Huerfano County, Colorado
Rio Grande National Forest
San Isabel National Forest
Sangre de Cristo Mountains
Fourteeners of Colorado
North American 4000 m summits
Sacred mountains
Religious places of the indigenous peoples of North America